Roda-Roda Kuala Lumpur (also known as Roda-Roda KL, lit. "Wheels of Kuala Lumpur") is a Malaysian police procedural television drama series produced by Skop Productions with original ideas and concepts by Yusof Haslam. First aired in 1998 on RTM, the original cast members are A. Galak, AC Mizal, Shaharon Anuar and Deen Maidin. The first reincarnation of the series was premiered on October 5, 1998 to March 29, 1999, and discontinued when Gerak Khas was first aired. The second reincarnation was revived in 2008 and aired until 2013.

Unlike Gerak Khas, a somewhat similar police procedural drama series, Roda-Roda Kuala Lumpur focuses on the noble efforts of Royal Malaysia Police's traffic policemen in carrying out their daily duties and highlights the frequent traffic crime cases such as illegal racing, dangerous driving and traffic light violations.

Cast

First run (1998-1999)
 A. Galak
 AC Mizal
 Deen Maidin
 Shaharon Anuar
 Rima Rashidi

Second run (2008-2013)
 Zack Kool
 Lando Zawawi
 Serina Redzuawan
 Jalaluddin Hassan
 Fauziah Latiff
 Roy Azman
 Z. Zamri
 Hanny Harmi
 Memey Suhaiza
 Farid Amirul
 Nash Lefthanded
 Aishah Atan
 Syafiq Yusof

See also
 Gerak Khas (TV series) (1999–2011; 2014–present)
 Metro Skuad (2012–2013)

Notes

References

Radio Televisyen Malaysia original programming
Malaysian drama television series
Police procedural television series
Kuala Lumpur in fiction
1998 Malaysian television series debuts
1999 Malaysian television series endings
2008 Malaysian television series debuts
2013 Malaysian television series endings